From Father to Son is a 1942 novel by the Finnish writer Mika Waltari.

References

External links

1942 Finnish novels
20th-century Finnish novels
Finnish-language novels
Novels by Mika Waltari
Family saga novels